Hormacrus is a genus of beetles in the family Carabidae, containing the following species:

 Hormacrus latus Sloane, 1898
 Hormacrus minor Blackburn, 1890

References

Licininae